Machinal is a 1928  play by American playwright and journalist Sophie Treadwell, inspired by the real-life case of convicted and executed murderer Ruth Snyder. Its Broadway premiere, directed by Arthur Hopkins, is considered one of the highpoints of Expressionist theatre on the American stage. 

Machinal has appeared on a variety of lists of the greatest plays.

Synopsis
A young woman works as a low-level stenographer and lives with her mother. She follows the rituals that society expects of a woman, however resistant she may feel about them. She subsequently marries her boss, whom she finds repulsive. After having a baby with him, she has an affair with a younger man who fuels her lust for life. Driven to murder her husband, she is convicted of the crime and is executed in the electric chair.

Production

Produced and directed by Arthur Hopkins, Machinal opened on Broadway at the Plymouth Theatre on September 7, 1928, and closed on November 24, 1928, after 91 performances. The scenic design was by Robert Edmond Jones, who used an open stage with a permanent background and made scene changes primarily with lighting. The play is presented in two parts, with ten scenes in the first and four in the second. The production is notable for featuring Clark Gable in his Broadway debut.

Cast
 Zita Johann as A Young Woman
 Millicent Green as A Telephone Girl
 Grace Atwell as A Stenographer
 Leopold Badia as A Filing Clerk
 Conway Washburn as An Adding Clerk and A Reporter
 Jean Adair as A Mother
 George Stillwell as A Husband
 Otto Frederick as A Bellboy and A Court Reporter
 Nancy Allan as A Nurse
 Monroe Childs as A Doctor
 Hal K. Dawson as A Young Man and Third Reporter
 Zenaide Ziegfeld as A Girl
 Jess Sidney as A Man
 Clyde Stork as A Boy
 Clark Gable as A Man
 Hugh M. Hite as Another Man and Second Reporter
 John Hanley as A Waiter, A Bailiff and A Jailer
 Tom Waters as A Judge
 John Connery as A Lawyer for Defense
 James Macdonald as A Lawyer for Prosecution
 Mrs. Charles Willard as A Matron
 Charles Kennedy as A Priest

In Britain, the play was first performed under the title The Life Machine in 1931.

Reception
"It was unfortunate that word was sent broadcast before the first performance of Machinal that its theme and characters grew out of the notorious Snyder-Gray murder case," wrote Perriton Maxwell, editor of Theatre Magazine. "The play bears no likeness to the sordid facts of that cheap tragedy … Machinal transcends the drab drama of the police court; it has a quality one finds it difficult to define, a beauty that cannot be conveyed in words, an aliveness and reality tinctured with poetic pathos which lift it to the realm of great art, greatly conceived and greatly presented." Calling Machinal "the most enthralling play of the year," Maxwell attributed the play's success to "three remarkable persons: Sophie Treadwell, Arthur Hopkins and Zita Johann."

"From the sordid mess of a brutal murder the author, actors and producer of Machinal … have with great skill managed to retrieve a frail and sombre beauty of character," wrote theatre critic Brooks Atkinson of The New York Times. "Subdued, monotonous, episodic, occasionally eccentric in its style, Machinal is fraught with a beauty unfamiliar to the stage." Atkinson describes the play as "the tragedy of one who lacks strength; she is not adaptable; she submits. … Being the exposition of a character, stark and austere in style, Machinal makes no excuses for the tragedy it unfolds."

Adaptations and Later Productions
Adapted for television by Irving Gaynor Neiman, Machinal was presented January 18, 1954, on NBC-TV's Robert Montgomery Presents. Reviewing the starring performance of Joan Lorring, Jack Gould of The New York Times wrote that "her interpretation of the mentally tortured young woman in Machinal, Sophie Treadwell's expressionistic and bitter poem for the theatre, must rank among the video season's finest accomplishments." The cast also included Malcolm Lee Beggs as the husband.

An adaptation of Machinal aired August 14, 1960, on ITV the United Kingdom in the ABC Armchair Theatre series. Joanna Dunham starred, with Donald Pleasence portraying the husband.

Machinal was produced Off-Broadway at the Gate Theatre, opening in April 1960, with direction by Gene Frankel, and featuring Delores Sutton, Vincent Gardenia, and Gerald O'Loughlin. In his review in The New York Times, Brooks Atkinson wrote "Gene Frankel has added modernistic details that visualize the inhumanity of the background... Ballou's cold settings, Lee Watson's macabre lighting complete the design of one of Off-Broadway's most vibrant performances."

The play was produced Off-Broadway by the New York Shakespeare Festival at the Public Theatre, running from September 25, 1990 to November 25, 1990. Directed by Michael Greif, the cast featured Jodie Markell (Young Woman), John Seitz (Husband), and Marge Redmond (Mother). The production won three Obie Awards: for Performance (Jodie Markell), Direction, and Design (John Gromada).

Machinal was revived by the Royal National Theatre in London in a production directed by Stephen Daldry. It opened on 15 October 1993 with Fiona Shaw as the Young Woman, Ciarán Hinds as the Man, and John Woodvine as the Husband. The scenic design, which included a large metal grid that moved into different positions for the play's different scenes, was by Ian MacNeil, costumes were by Clare Mitchell, lighting design was by Rick Fisher, with music by Stephen Warbeck.

A production directed by Risa Brainin was included in the 2000/2001 season by Missouri Repertory Theatre.

A revival opened on Broadway in a Roundabout Theatre production at the American Airlines Theatre on January 16, 2014,  directed by   Lyndsey Turner, featuring Rebecca Hall, Michael Cumpsty, Suzanne Bertish and Morgan Spector.

A new production opened at the Almeida Theatre in London on June 4, 2018, directed by Natalie Abrahami.

A production of Machinal was presented at Muhlenberg College, Allentown, PA on September 27–30, 2018, directed by Lou Jacob, Baker Artist-in-Residence.

A production, advised by the Tony-nominated lighting designer of the 2014 Broadway revival production, opened at Princeton University in January 2019.

A production of Machinal was presented at the Bolton Theater at Kenyon College, Gambier, OH on February 1–2, 2019, directed by Anton Dudley and starring Delilah Draper, Teddy Fischer and Alec Ogihara.

A production of Machinal was presented by the Richard Burton Theatre Company at the Royal Welsh College of Music and Drama in Cardiff in February 2019.

A production of Machinal was presented by the CBU Boardmore Theatre Company at the Boardmore Playhouse, Cape Breton University, in Cape Breton Regional Municipality, Nova Scotia, Canada in February 2019.

A production of Machinal was presented by the College of Saint Rose Theatre Company at the College of Saint Rose, in Albany, New York from April 4 to 7 of 2019.

A production of Machinal was translated and adapted in Filipino ("Makinal") by thesis students in the University of the Philippines Diliman, in April 2019.

The play was adapted to take place in the 80s for University College London's Drama Society production of Machinal, which was presented at the Bloomsbury Theatre from November 18th to 20th of 2021. In this adaptation, the young woman has an affair with another woman.

In September 2021, a play reading event of Machinal was led by the Crane Creations Theatre Company. This monthly event is hosted by professional theatre artists and aims to spread awareness of playwrights from around the globe.

Legacy
Machinal was included in Burns Mantle's The Best Plays of 1928–29.

In 2013, Machinal was included on Entertainment Weekly's list of the "50 Greatest Plays of the Past 100 Years".

In 2015, theatre critic Michael Billington included the play in his list of the "101 greatest plays" ever written in any western language.

In 2019, Machinal was named as one of the "40 best plays of all time" by The Independent.

In 2020, Machinal was included on BroadwayWorld's list of the "101 GREATEST PLAYS of the Past 100 Years".

Accolades

The Royal National Theatre production won three 1994 Laurence Olivier Awards, for Best Revival of a Play or Comedy, for Fiona Shaw as Best Actress and Stephen Daldry as Best Director of a Play. Ian MacNeil was nominated as Best Set Designer.

The 2014 Broadway production received four 2014 Tony Award nominations: Best Scenic Design of a Play (Es Devlin), Best Costume Design of a Play (Michael Krass), Best Lighting Design of a Play (Jane Cox) and Best Sound Design of a Play (Matt Tierney).

References

Sources
 Treadwell, Sophie. 1993. Machinal. London: Nick Hern Books and Royal National Theatre, London. .

External links
 
 
 

1928 plays
Broadway plays
Expressionist plays
Mariticide in fiction
Off-Broadway plays
Plays based on actual events
Plays by Sophie Treadwell
West End plays